Osama Al-Hamdan (Arabic:أسامه الحمدان; born 1 November 1988) is a football (soccer) player who currently plays as a goalkeeper.

References

External links
 http://www.slstat.com/spl2008-2009ar/player.php?id=1205

1988 births
Living people
Saudi Arabian footballers
Ittihad FC players
Al-Watani Club players
Al-Diriyah Club players
Al-Fayha FC players
Al-Jabalain FC players
Al-Orobah FC players
Al-Nahda Club (Saudi Arabia) players
Ettifaq FC players
Al-Mujazzal Club players
Al-Jubail Club players
Saudi First Division League players
Saudi Professional League players
Saudi Second Division players
Association football goalkeepers